For Valour is a 1917 American silent war drama film directed by Albert Parker and starring Winifred Allen, Richard Barthelmess and Mabel Ballin. The film was produced and distributed by Triangle Films and shot at the company's New York studios. It was based on a short story by I.A.R. Wylie which originally appeared in the Good Housekeeping magazine.

Synopsis
Canada, 1917. After discovering that her brother has stolen cash from his employer, his sister Melia steals money from the star of the theatre where she works. She pays off his debts but in exchange he agrees to enlist in the Canadian Army and fight in World War I. Melia is then enlisted and send to prison for theft, and is disowned by her father, after refusing to explain why she took the money. When her brother returns home from France minus an arm but bearing the Victoria Cross he has been awarded for bravery, she feels the sacrifice she has made has been worth it.

Cast
 Winifred Allen as Melia Nobbs
 Richard Barthelmess as 	Henry Nobbs
 Henry Weaver as 	Ambrose Nobbs
 Mabel Ballin as Alice Davis

References

Bibliography
 Lombardi, Frederic . Allan Dwan and the Rise and Decline of the Hollywood Studios. McFarland, 2013.

External links
 

1910s American films
1917 films
1917 drama films
1910s English-language films
American silent feature films
American black-and-white films
Films directed by Albert Parker
Triangle Film Corporation films
Films set in Canada
Silent American drama films